Philipp Daniel Haas (born 1960) is an investor, CEO and businessman.

Haas is currently Chairman and CEO of Deva Holding A.S., a Turkish pharmaceutical company.

Early Years 
Philipp Haas was born in July, 1960 in Switzerland.

In 1985 Haas completed a Master of Business Administration (MBA) from the University of St. Gallen.

Current interests

Pharmaceutical Industry 
Established in 1958, pharmaceutical manufacturer Deva is a Turkish Fortune 500 company with annual revenue of more than US$250 million and staff of approximately 2,300 across its operations in Turkey, Germany, USA and New Zealand.

In 2006, Haas founded Eastpharma as part of a take over of Deva Holding and was subsequently elected Chairman of the company that year and CEO in 2008.

Banking and Investments 

In 1985 Haas began his career in investment banking with First Boston in New York and Credit Suisse First Boston (CSFB) in London and moved on to asset management with Swiss private banks Pictet and Sarasin.

Haas then started his own hedge fund operation focused primarily in emerging markets with clients including George Soros and Sir John Templeton.

References

External links 
Deva Pharamaceuticals

1960 births
Living people
New Zealand businesspeople